An autoantibody is an antibody (a type of protein) produced by the immune system that is directed against one or more of the individual's own proteins. Many autoimmune diseases (notably lupus erythematosus) are associated with such antibodies.

Production 

Antibodies are produced by B cells in two ways: (i) randomly, and (ii) in response to a foreign protein or substance within the body. Initially, one B cell produces one specific kind of antibody. In either case, the B cell is allowed to proliferate or is killed off through a process called clonal deletion. Normally, the immune system is able to recognize and ignore the body's own healthy proteins, cells, and tissues, and to not overreact to non-threatening substances in the environment, such as foods. Sometimes, the immune system ceases to recognize one or more of the body's normal constituents as "self," leading to production of pathological autoantibodies. Autoantibodies may also play a nonpathological role; for instance they may help the body to destroy cancers and to eliminate waste products. The role of autoantibodies in normal immune function is also a subject of scientific research.

Cause 

The causes of autoantibody production are varied and not well understood. It is thought that some autoantibody production is due to a genetic predisposition combined with an environmental trigger, such as a viral illness or a prolonged exposure to certain toxic chemicals. There is generally not a direct genetic link however.
While families may be susceptible to autoimmune conditions, individual family members may have different autoimmune disorders, or may never develop an autoimmune condition. Researchers believe that there may also be a hormonal component as many of the autoimmune conditions are much more prevalent in women of childbearing age. While the initial event that leads to the production of autoantibodies is still unknown, there is a body of evidence that autoantibodies may have the capacity to maintain their production.

Diseases

The type of autoimmune disorder or disease that occurs and the amount of destruction done to the body depends on which systems or organs are targeted by the autoantibodies, and how strongly. Disorders caused by organ specific autoantibodies, those that primarily target a single organ, (such as the thyroid in Graves' disease and Hashimoto's thyroiditis), are often the easiest to diagnose as they frequently present with organ related symptoms. Disorders due to systemic autoantibodies can be much more elusive. Although the associated autoimmune disorders are rare, the signs and symptoms they cause are relatively common. Symptoms may include: arthritis-type joint pain, fatigue, fever, rashes, cold or allergy-type symptoms, weight loss, and muscular weakness. Associated conditions include vasculitis which are inflammation of blood vessels and anemia. Even if they are due to a particular systemic autoimmune condition, the symptoms will vary from person to person, vary over time, vary with organ involvement, and they may taper off or flare unexpectedly. Add to this the fact that a person may have more than one autoantibody, and thus have more than one autoimmune disorder, and/or have an autoimmune disorder without a detectable level of an autoantibody, complicating making a diagnosis.

The diagnosis of disorders associated with systemic autoantibodies starts with a complete medical history and a thorough physical exam. Based on the patient's signs and symptoms, the doctor may request one or more diagnostic studies that will help to identify a specific disease. As a rule, information is required from multiple sources, rather than a single laboratory test to accurately diagnose disorders associated with systemic autoantibodies. Tests may include:
 blood tests to detect inflammation, autoantibodies, and organ involvement
 x-rays and other imaging scans to detect changes in bones, joints, and organs
 biopsies to look for pathologic changes in tissue specimens

Indications for autoantibody tests 
Autoantibody tests may be ordered as part of an investigation of chronic progressive arthritis type symptoms and/or unexplained fevers, fatigue, muscle weakness and rashes. The antinuclear antibody (ANA) test is often ordered first. ANA is a marker of the autoimmune process – it is positive with a variety of different autoimmune diseases but not specific. Consequently, if an ANA test is positive, it is often followed up with other tests associated with arthritis and inflammation, such as a rheumatoid factor (RF), an erythrocyte sedimentation rate (ESR), a c-reactive protein (CRP), and/or complement protein|complement levels.

A single autoantibody test is not diagnostic, but may give clues as to whether a particular disorder is likely or unlikely to be present. Each autoantibody result should be considered individually and as part of the group. Some disorders, such as systemic lupus erythematosus (SLE) may be more likely if several autoantibodies are present, while others, such as mixed connective tissue disease (MCTD) may be more likely if a single autoantibody, ribonucleic protein (RNP), is the only one present. Those who have more than one autoimmune disorder may have several detectable autoantibodies.

Whether a particular autoantibody will be present is both very individual and a matter of statistics. Each will be present in a certain percentage of people who have a particular autoimmune disorder. For instance, up to 80% of those with SLE will have a positive double strand anti-double stranded DNA (anti-dsDNA) autoantibody test, but only about 25-30% will have a positive RNP. Some individuals who do have an autoimmune disorder will have negative autoantibody test results, but at a later date – as the disorder progresses - the autoantibodies may develop.

Systemic autoantibody tests are used to:

 Help diagnose systemic autoimmune disorders.
 Help determine the degree of organ or system involvement and damage (Along with other tests such as a complete blood count or comprehensive metabolic panel)
 Monitor the course of the disorder and the effectiveness of treatments. There is no prevention or cure for autoimmune disorders at this time. Treatment is used to alleviate symptoms and to help maintain body function.
 Monitor remissions, flares, and relapses

Antibody profiling

Antibody profiling is used for identifying persons from forensic samples. The
technology can uniquely identify a person by analyzing the antibodies in body fluids. A
unique, individual set of antibodies, called individual specific autoantibodies (ISA) is found
in blood, serum, saliva, urine, semen, perspiration, tears, and body tissues, and the antibodies
are not affected by illness, medication, or food/drug intake. An unskilled technician using
inexpensive equipment can complete a test in a couple of hours.

List of some autoantibodies and commonly associated diseases

Note: the sensitivity and specificity of various autoantibodies for a particular disease is different for different diseases.

See also
Anti-glutamate receptor antibodies
Reference ranges for blood tests#Autoantibodies
Paraneoplastic syndrome

References

External links
Autoimmunity – an Introduction Industrial Learning Unit on Chemgaroo
 Autoimmunityblog - summaries of research articles + glossary terms
 
 Detection of autoantibodies with self-assembling radiolabeled antigen tetramers (a protocol)
 Antibody Sensors

 
 
Antibodies